Parulekar is an Indian surname. Notable people with the surname include:

Bapusaheb Parulekar (born 1929), Indian politician
Dilip Parulekar, Indian politician
Godavari Parulekar (1907–1996), freedom fighter, writer, and social activist
Nanasaheb Parulekar (1898–1973), Indian journalist

Surnames of Indian origin